

Gmina Radowo Małe is a rural gmina (administrative district) in Łobez County, West Pomeranian Voivodeship, in north-western Poland.

Villages
Gmina Radowo Małe contains the villages and settlements of Borkowo Małe, Borkowo Wielkie, Czachowo, Dargomyśl, Dobrkowo, Gildnica, Gostomin, Karnice, Maliniec, Mołdawin, Mołdawinek, Orle, Pogorzelica, Radowo Małe, Radowo Wielkie, Radzim, Rekowo, Rogowo, Siedlice, Sienno Dolne, Sienno Górne, Smorawina, Strzmiele, Sułkowo, Troszczyno, Ukłejki, Wołkowo and Żelmowo.

Neighbouring gminas
Gmina Radowo Małe is bordered by the gminas of Dobra, Łobez, Nowogard, Resko and Węgorzyno.

References
Polish official population figures 2006

Radowo Male
Łobez County